The Devotional Tour was a 1993 concert tour by English electronic band Depeche Mode in support of the group's eighth studio album, Songs of Faith and Devotion, which was released in March 1993.

The group continued to promote Songs of Faith and Devotion the following year on the Exotic Tour/Summer Tour '94, which included an additional North American leg. Q magazine refers to Devotional Tour as "the most debauched rock tour ever".

The tour began with an eleven-week European leg, which kicked off in Lille, France, in mid-May and culminated in London in late July. In September 1993, the group began a North American leg, which commenced in Quebec City, Canada. The 50-date tour continued until early December, when it wrapped up in Mexico City. Later in the month, the band returned to Europe for a short tour of the United Kingdom and Ireland. The five date jaunt began in Dublin and ended, once again, in London.

Releases 

The concerts in Barcelona, Liévin and Frankfurt were filmed, with the compiled footage issued later that year on a video release entitled Devotional. The video was reissued on DVD in 2004. Additionally, a live album entitled Songs of Faith and Devotion Live was released in December 1993. The album was a track-by-track live duplicate of Songs of Faith and Devotion. The release featured recordings from the concert in Liévin, although two of the tracks were recorded in Copenhagen and New Orleans respectively. Certain tracks were also released on the singles Condemnation and In Your Room.

Setlist

"Higher Love"
"Policy of Truth"
"World in My Eyes"
"Walking in My Shoes"
"Behind the Wheel"
"Halo"
"Stripped"
"Condemnation"
Song performed by Martin Gore
 "Judas" 
 "A Question of Lust"
 "Death's Door" (Acoustic)
 "One Caress"
"Get Right with Me" 
"Mercy in You"
"I Feel You"
"Never Let Me Down Again"
"Rush"
"In Your Room"
 encore 1
"Personal Jesus"
"Enjoy the Silence"
 encore 2
"Fly on the Windscreen" 
"Something to Do" (only known performance: 25 May 1993 Brussels) 
Song performed by Martin Gore
 "Somebody"
"Everything Counts"

Note: Setlist additions featuring multiple songs are options which were rotated between dates.

Tour dates

Festivals and other miscellaneous performances
Belga Beach Festival

Musicians

Depeche Mode
 Dave Gahan – lead vocals
 Martin Gore – guitar, synthesizers, samplers, lead and backing vocals
 Alan Wilder – synthesizers, samplers, piano, drums, percussion pads, backing vocals
 Andy Fletcher – synthesizers, samplers, backing vocals

Backup musicians
 Hildia Campbell – backing vocals
 Samantha Smith – backing vocals

Production staff
 Production Manager – Craig Sherwood
 Production Manager – Andy Franks
 Stage Manager – Howard Hopkins
 Stage Manager – Tom Wilson
 Rigger – Phil Broad
 Wardrobe – Carol Graham
 Wardrobe – Paula Bradley
 Keyboard Tech – Wob Roberts
 Guitar Tech – Jez Webb
 Drum Technician – Tom Wilson
 FOH Sound Engineer – Jon Lemon
 Sound Crew Chief – Dave Bracey
 Sound Crew – Scott Ashton
 Video/Projection – Richard Turner
 Lighting Designer – Patrick Woodroffe
 Stage Design & Concept – Anton Corbjin

Trivia
The show in Rome was originally scheduled at the PalaGhiaccio, but the promoter moved it to the PalaEur a few weeks before the event.

References

External links
 

Depeche Mode concert tours
1993 concert tours